Lost in the Glare is the seventh studio album by American musical duo Barn Owl. It was released on September 13, 2011 by Thrill Jockey.

Critical reception
Lost in the Glare was met with "universal acclaim" reviews from critics. At Metacritic, which assigns a weighted average rating out of 100 to reviews from mainstream publications, this release received an average score of 84 based on 5 reviews.

In a review for AllMusic, critic reviewer Thom Jurek wrote: "Over eight cuts and 41 minutes, Lost in the Glare reveals itself to be the most dynamic and diverse record in Barn Owl's oeuvre thus far, though it may not seem that way initially. With slow, plodding, brooding drums by Jacob Felix Heule, the distortion and long, deliberately strung-out single-line melody followed by an amped-up series of chord changes makes it the most obviously post-psych thing they've recorded to date." Adrian Dziewanski of Dusted Magazine said: "Lost in the Glare, Barn Owl's seventh album proper and second since they've signed with Thrill Jockey, is the culmination of a sound that the core members of the band, Jon Porras and Evan Caminiti, have stuck to since the beginning. Delicately thrummed and confidently plucked guitars, raga-infused tonalities and vocal drones make up the core of this sound.

Track listing

Personnel

Barn Owl members
 Evan Caminiti – guitar, organ, vocals
 Jon Porras – guitar, piano
Additional musicians
 Steve Dye – clarinet
 Michael Elrod – gong, tanpura
 Jacob Felix Heule – drums

Production
 Phil Manley – engineer, producer
 Rashad Becker − mastering

References

External links
 
 
 Lost in the Glare at Thrill Jockey

2011 albums
Thrill Jockey albums
Barn Owl (band) albums